Edward John "Chips" Hardy (born 23 January 1950) is an English novelist, playwright and screenwriter. He and Elizabeth Ann, his wife, are the parents of actor Tom Hardy, with whom Hardy worked on BBC One's 2017 drama series Taboo, as the co-creator, a writer and a consulting producer.

Career 
Alongside a career in advertising as a creative director, Hardy has written for television, film, theatre, novels and stand-up material. Productions include a children’s television series with a talking chair called Helping Henry and About Face, a television drama with Maureen Lipman. He also won a British Comedy Award for his work with Irish comedian Dave Allen.

In 2007, Hardy’s novel Each Day A Small Victory was published in the form of frontline dispatches from amongst the embattled wildlife in an English country lay-by, illustrated by Oscar Grillo.

Blue on Blue, Hardy’s darkly comic play on self-harm, was first showcased at the Latchmere 503 in London in 2007. The play was revived in 2016 at the Tristan Bates in London in partnership with BLESMA, the British Limbless Ex-serviceman’s Association. In 2008, Hardy’s one woman dysfunctional Cabaret, There’s Something In The Fridge that Wants To Kill Me!, ran notably at the Edinburgh Festival.

In 2009, inspired by an idea from his son Tom, he and Tom created the story that was to become the 2017 eight-part series Taboo. Hardy is the co-creator, a writer and a consulting producer. His work on the screenplay for Taboo earned him the Writer’s Guild of Great Britain award for Best Long Form TV Drama in 2018.

In June 2021 it was announced that Hardy's next novel, 'Seaton's Orchid' would be published by Chiselbury Publishing.

References

External links
 
 

1950 births
Living people
English television writers
People from London